The Transformers (cover-titled simply Transformers from issue #200) was a comic published by Marvel UK for 332 issues, from 1984 to 1991. It consisted of re-printed material from the American Transformers comic, as well as original UK material. The format of the comic changed several times during its seven-year run.

First Format
From 20 September 1984 to 14 September 1985 – Issues 1 to 26 – Transformers was published fortnightly. It contained a single Transformers story, along with varying back-up strips.

Second Format
From 21 September 1985 (Issue 27) to 9 February 1991 (Issue 308), Transformers was published weekly, before reverting to fortnightly publication for its final twenty-four issues. During its Second Format, it contained a single Transformers story, along with varying back-up strips.

Third Format
For a limited period, Transformers UK featured cover-to-cover Transformers action, with the back-up strip featuring reprints of the US Transformers spin-off series Headmasters.

Fourth Format
With the completion of Headmasters, Transformers UK returned to featuring a single Transformers story, along with varying back-up strips.

Fifth Format

External links 

UK
British comics
Comics anthologies
Science fiction comics
1984 comics debuts